Henry Kiprono Kirwa (born 4 May 1973), commonly known as Henry Kirwa, is a Paralympian athlete from Kenya competing mainly in category T13 middle-distance events.

He competed in the 2008 Summer Paralympics in Beijing, China.  There he won a gold medal in the men's 1500 metres - T13 event, a gold medal in the men's 5000 metres - T13 event and a gold medal in the men's 10000 metres - T12 event.

References

External links 
 

1973 births
Living people
Kenyan male middle-distance runners
Kenyan male long-distance runners
Paralympic athletes of Kenya
Paralympic gold medalists for Kenya
Paralympic bronze medalists for Kenya
Athletes (track and field) at the 2008 Summer Paralympics
Athletes (track and field) at the 2012 Summer Paralympics
Athletes (track and field) at the 2016 Summer Paralympics
Medalists at the 2008 Summer Paralympics
Medalists at the 2012 Summer Paralympics
Medalists at the 2016 Summer Paralympics
Paralympic medalists in athletics (track and field)